Dan Nlundulu (born 5 February 1999) is a professional footballer who plays as a forward for EFL League One club Bolton Wanderers, on loan from Southampton. Born in France, he represents England internationally.

Club career
Nlundulu signed a two-year contract extension in September 2019. He made his first match day squad appearance as an unused substitute against Manchester United on 31 August 2019. On 25 October 2020, Nlundulu made his senior debut as a substitute in Southampton's 2–0 home league win over Everton.

On 19 January 2021, Nlundulu scored his first goal in Southampton's 2–0 victory over Shrewsbury Town in the FA Cup.

On 14 July 2021, he signed a new three-year contract at Southampton, before being immediately loaned out to Lincoln City on a season-long loan. He made his debut for the Imps on 17 August, coming off the bench against Bolton Wanderers. He scored his first goal for the club against Wigan Athletic on 26 October 2021. On 6 January 2022, Southampton recalled Nlundulu from his loan spell. Later that day, he joined Cheltenham Town on loan until the end of the season.

On 4 July 2022, Nlundulu rejoined Cheltenham Town until 8 January 2023.

On 9 January 2023, Nlundulu joined Bolton Wanderers on a loan deal until the end of the season.

International career
Born in France, Nlundulu is of Congolese descent. He moved to England at a young age with his family, when his brother Gaël joined local rivals Portsmouth in 2008 from PSG. He is a youth international for England.

Career statistics

References

External links

Southampton FC Profile

1999 births
Living people
Black British sportspeople
English footballers
England youth international footballers
French footballers
French emigrants to England
Naturalised citizens of the United Kingdom
English sportspeople of Democratic Republic of the Congo descent
French sportspeople of Democratic Republic of the Congo descent
Association football forwards
Chelsea F.C. players
Southampton F.C. players
Lincoln City F.C. players
Cheltenham Town F.C. players
Bolton Wanderers F.C. players 
Premier League players
English Football League players
Black French sportspeople